Zuzana Štefániová (14 January 1788 – after 1829) was the first female printer in Slovakia. She was the daughter of Stefan Wester and married Ján Štefáni, owner of the oldest and, at the time, the only printing shop in Slovakia. She inherited the printing shop in 1822, and managed it for seven years.she left in 1829 and died after 1829

References 

19th-century businesswomen
19th-century printers
19th-century Slovak people
1788 births
1820s deaths
Year of death unknown